KVRY-LP (99.5 FM) was a low-power FM radio station serving Santa Barbara and Goleta, California. After obtaining its Federal Communications Commission (FCC) license, KVRY-LP was granted a construction permit on February 10, 2003, and began broadcasting on February 7, 2006. KVRY-LP's license was cancelled on December 1, 2013, for failing to file an application for renewal.

On August 20, 2014, the FCC granted Calvary Chapel of Santa Barbara a construction permit for a new low-power FM radio station with the same KVRY-LP call letters. The license to cover was granted on June 29, 2017. The city of license changed from Goleta to Santa Barbara, the frequency changed from 96.3 MHz to 99.5 MHz and it broadcasts from a different transmitter site. That license was cancelled on July 30, 2021

References

External links
Calvary Chapel Santa Barbara
 

Defunct radio stations in the United States
Radio stations disestablished in 2021
VRY-LP
VRY-LP
Defunct religious radio stations in the United States
Radio stations established in 2017
2017 establishments in California
2021 disestablishments in California
VRY-LP